Coptotelia fenestrella is a moth in the family Depressariidae. It was described by Philipp Christoph Zeller in 1863. It is found in Colombia and Venezuela.

References

Moths described in 1863
Coptotelia